Wacław Hański (1782–1841) was a Polish noble (Korczak coat of arms), landowner, marszałek of the nobility in the Volhynian Governorate. He was the first husband of Ewelina Hańska.

References
Andrzej Biernacki, HAŃSKI Wacław (1782–1841) marszałek szlachty wołyńskiej, Polski Słownik Biograficzny, t. 9 p. 287–288
Zygmunt Czerny, HAŃSKA Ewelina (1800–1882) dama polska, Polski Słownik Biograficzny, t. 9 p. 286–287

External links
Genealogy page

1782 births
1841 deaths
19th-century Polish nobility
Clan of Korczak